Jon Hume is an Australian-born New Zealand musician, songwriter and record producer based between Los Angeles and Nashville who has written and produced songs for JP Cooper, Galantis, Bebe Rexha, Guy Sebastian, Sofi Tukker, Dean Lewis, Icona Pop, Elle King and Zhu. He is also known as the eldest of three brothers (with Peter and Dann Hume) who make up the New Zealand band Evermore, of which he is the lead singer.

References

External links
Evermore official website

Living people
Evermore (band) members
New Zealand guitarists
New Zealand male guitarists
People from Feilding
Australian emigrants to New Zealand
People from the Northern Rivers
Year of birth missing (living people)